Workbook is the 1989 debut solo album by American guitarist and singer Bob Mould, following the breakup of the influential punk rock band Hüsker Dü. The album has a strong folk influence and lighter overall sound than he had been known for, although heavy guitar features occasionally. Drummer Anton Fier and bassist Tony Maimone, both of Pere Ubu fame, served as Mould's rhythm section on the album and on the subsequent live shows. The single "See a Little Light" was a hit on the US Modern Rock chart.

The album has been influential in the alternative rock community: its acoustic elements would be echoed in R.E.M.'s 1992 album Automatic for the People, while Nirvana's 1993 album In Utero used cellos in a similar way.

In the liner notes of the Hüsker Dü live album The Living End, writer David Fricke noted that Mould had an embryonic version of the song "Compositions for the Young and Old" in the waning days of that band.

"Poison Years" is directed at Hüsker Dü drummer Grant Hart. "There's people who think I'm still sending missiles to Grant," said Mould at the time of his band Sugar's album File Under Easy Listening in 1994. "Sorry to disappoint you, but I took care of that about five years ago. Check out side one, song five on Workbook."

The album was reissued on CD and double LP for its 25th anniversary in 2014 as Workbook 25, by Omnivore Recordings. This remastered edition includes an extra track, "All Those People Know", and a second CD-only disc containing a 1989 live set by Mould at the Cabaret Metro in Chicago.

Track listing

Personnel
 Bob Mould – vocals, guitar, mandolin, keyboards, percussion
 Tony Maimone – bass guitar
 Anton Fier – drums
 Jane Scarpantoni – cello
 Steven Haigler – engineer, mixing, percussion
 Chris Stamey – rhythm guitar, backing vocals (live disc only)

Charts
Album

Single

References

Bob Mould albums
1989 debut albums
Albums produced by Bob Mould
Virgin Records albums
Omnivore Recordings albums